The Boscobel Dial is a regional newspaper based in Boscobel, Wisconsin and printed in Lancaster, Wisconsin. The Boscobel Dial is owned by Morris Multimedia.  The newspaper was first published in 1872. it currently has a circulation of 5,100 copies.

In 1956 the Dial was bought by reporter and editor Ralph Goldsmith, who ran it with his wife until selling it in 1992. On its sale, Goldsmith cited his son's reluctance to follow him into the business. Goldsmith was entered into the Wisconsin Newspaper Hall of Fame in 2002.

The paper was sold by William Hale to Morris Multimedia in 2002 as one paper in a seven paper deal.

Current staff
 Joe Hart - Editor
 Barb Puckett - Production Manager
 Lacy Bussan - Ad Sales
 Elizabeth Sobek - Ad Sales
 Emily Koch- Ad design

References

External links
 SWnews4u official website

Newspapers published in Wisconsin
Grant County, Wisconsin